Terence Arthur De Marney (1 March 190825 May 1971) was a British film, stage, radio and television actor, as well as theatre director and writer.

Career

Actor 
The son of Violet Eileen Concanen and Arthur De Marney, and the grandson of noted Victorian lithographer Alfred Concanen, his career in the theatre began in 1923 and continued almost without interruption, taking in film, radio and television parts. He toured with Mrs Patrick Campbell in The Last of Mrs. Cheyney. In 1930 he played Gustave in The Lady of the Camellias, and toured South Africa as Raleigh in Journey's End. In 1934 he played Tybalt in Romeo and Juliet at the Open Air Theatre, and Giovanni in 'Tis Pity She's a Whore at the Arts. Thrillers tended to be his stock in trade, appearing in a revival of Sutton Vane's Outward Bound during the 1930s, as well as Agatha Christie's Ten Little Indians and Dear Murderer. In later years he appeared in a revival of Gerald Du Maurier's Trilby.

He also appeared on radio as the Count of Monte Cristo, and was the first actor to portray Leslie Charteris' Simon Templar on radio, when The Saint debuted on Radio Athlone in 1940 for six episodes.

He made his film debut in 1931, and went on to appear in a number of quota quickies of the period, including mystery horror films The Unholy Quest (1934) and The Mystery of the Mary Celeste (1935), the latter opposite Bela Lugosi. His distinctive looks seemed to fit the macabre and he would continue to appear in horror films throughout his career including Pharaoh's Curse (1957), the Boris Karloff vehicle Die, Monster, Die! (1965) and The Hand of Night (1968).

After starring in 'B' films Dual Alibi (1948), and No Way Back (1949), he uprooted to Hollywood, where he appeared in a number of famous television series such as Bonanza, Wagon Train, Maverick, Thriller, and The Twilight Zone. He was a series regular in the role of Case Thomas on CBS's Johnny Ringo, with Don Durant, Mark Goddard, and Karen Sharpe. He also played small roles in such Hollywood films as The Silver Chalice (1954), The Virgin Queen (1955), The Ten Commandments (1956), Spartacus and Midnight Lace (both 1960).

He returned to Britain in the 1960s and continued to appear in television series such as Maigret, Dr. Finlay's Casebook, Doctor Who and Z-Cars. His later film appearances were Separation, The Strange Affair  and All Neat in Black Stockings (all 1968).

Director 
In 1931 he became director of the Connaught Theatre, Worthing, and in 1932, with his brother, the actor Derrick De Marney, he founded the Independent Theatre Club at the Kingsway Theatre, where he directed Emil Ludwig's Versailles and an adaptation of Schnitzler's novel Fraulein Else. He also directed Louis Golding's Magnolia Street Story and Master Crook, originally called Cosh Boy. With his brother he alternated as Slim Callaghan in Meet Slim Callaghan at the Garrick Theatre and carried on the same role in the play's sequel Slim Carves, which he produced and directed.

Writer 
De Marney wrote the play Wanted for Murder in 1946, which was made into a film, and was also known as A Voice in the Night. With Percy Robinson he wrote the stage thrillers The Whispering Gallery, Wanted for Murder and The Crime of Margaret Foley; he collaborated with Ralph Stock to write Search. He co-wrote the screenplay for No Way Back (1949), in which he starred, with the director Stefan Osiecki.

Death
De Marney died in 1971, aged 63, after an accidental fall in front of a train in the London Underground. He was buried in the family plot at West Norwood Cemetery in South London.

Spouses
His first wife was Diana Hope-Dunbar nee Fraser, whom he married in 1937. He married his second wife, actress Beryl Measor, in 1945, and they remained married until her death in 1965.

Filmography

Selected television

References

External links

Obituary published in The Times.  Excerpt.
Terence De Marney as The Saint

1908 births
1971 deaths
English male film actors
English male stage actors
English male radio actors
English male television actors
English theatre directors
English writers
Male actors from London
Railway accident deaths in England
Burials at West Norwood Cemetery
Writers from London
20th-century English male actors